Li Yanyan (born 18 June 1981 in Linyi, Shandong) is a male Chinese Greco-Roman wrestler who will compete at the 2008 Summer Olympics.

His personal best was coming 1st at the 2006 World Championships.

References
 profile

External links
 

1981 births
Living people
Chinese male sport wrestlers
Olympic wrestlers of China
People from Linyi
Wrestlers at the 2008 Summer Olympics
Sportspeople from Shandong